Birim South District is one of the thirty-three districts in Eastern Region, Ghana. Originally it was formerly part of the then-larger and first Birim South District (with Akim Oda as its capital town) in 1988, which was created from the former Birim District Council, until the western part of the district was split off to create a new Birim South District on 29 February 2008; thus the remaining part has been renamed as Birim Central Municipal District, with Akim Oda as its capital town. However on 15 March 2018, the eastern part of the district was split off to become Achiase District; thus the remaining part has been retained as Birim South District. The district assembly is located in the southwest part of Eastern Region and has Akim Swedru as its capital town.

Boundaries
The Birim South District is located in the south of Eastern Ghana. It is bordered on the north east by the Birim Central Municipal District. To the west is the Assin North Municipal District in the Central Region and to the south, the newly created Achiase District and Agona West District, also in the Central Region.

Geography
The district covers an area of 299.5 square kilometres. Within it are a lot of hills, streams and rivers. It has 2 peak rain seasons during May–June and September–October. The relative humidity ranges from 56% during the dry season and 70% during the rainy season. The district lies within a semi-deciduous rainforest region. The Birim River flows through Birim South District.

Demographics
The population is 47.6% male and 51.4% female. 56% of the population live in rural areas.

Administration
The highest political and administrative body in the district is the District Assembly. The District Executive is the political and administrative head. The assembly also has a presiding member who is the chairperson. There are 3 sub-district councils. They are the Akim Swedru Urban Council, Achiasi Town Council and the Aperadi Area Council.

List of settlements
The town of Akim Swedru, is the capital. The other major settlements in the Birim South district are Achiasi and Aperadi. Achiasi is the main commercial centre.

See also
Eastern Region
Akim Swedru

Sources
 
 Districts: Birim South District
 Birim South District Official Website

References

Districts of the Eastern Region (Ghana)